A.R.S.R. "Skadi", is a Dutch student rowing club located in Rotterdam, The Netherlands.

The name "Skadi" refers to the goddess Skaði from Norse mythology, while A.R.S.R. is the abbreviation for "Algemene Rotterdamse Studenten Roeivereniging" which is Dutch for "Comprehensive Rotterdam Student Rowing Club." Skadi has won The Varsity, the oldest and most prestigious Dutch student rowing event, a total of 9 times.

Skadi is the only rowing club affiliated with Erasmus University Rotterdam. It is situated beside the Noorderkanaal just north of the city centre, which is connected to the river Rotte, where the rowers do most of their training.

History
On October 28, 1928, members of the Rotterdamsch Studenten Corps R.S.C. (student society) established the "Rotterdamsche Studenten Roeivereeniging" (R.S.R.V.) Skadi. Initially sharing a location with Royal "Maas" Yacht Club, they got their own place in 1949. From 1972 non-R.S.C. members could join.

In 1962 Skadi became a member of the "". While it incorporated the women's society Phecda, part of Rotterdamsche Vrouwelijke Studenten Vereeniging R.V.S.V., (est. 1967) before that in 1976 it also merged with A.R.S.R. & Z.Hades (est. 1961)  and became "Algemene Rotterdamse Studenten Roeivereniging" (A.R.S.R.) Skadi. Membership of either R.S.C. or R.V.S.V. was no longer mandatory.

Facilities
The club's facilities include 22 Concept2 ergos, kept in their boathouse. It has 10 eights, 30+ skiffs and more than 100 boats in total. Skadi has its own boatsman, who works full-time.

Prizes

National

1971 Won "Head of the River Amstel"
1981 Won Dutch "Varsity", modelled after the Oxford and Cambridge Boat Race
1992 Won Dutch "Varsity"
1995 Holland beker.
2001 Won Dutch "Varsity"
2006 Won Dutch "Varsity"
2007 Won Dutch "Varsity"
2008 Won Dutch "Varsity"
2009 Won Dutch "Varsity"
2010 Won Dutch "Varsity"
2015 Won Dutch "Varsity"

International
1974 Silver Rowing World Cup
1977 Bronze Rowing World Cup, world record on 100 km
1978 Silver Rowing World Cup
1986 World record women 100 km
1989 Gold Rowing World Cup (M4x)
1990 Bronze Rowing World Cup (LM4-)
1991 Bronze Rowing World Cup (M4x)
1996 Gold at Olympic Games (M8+) Koos Maasdijk
1997 Bronze Rowing World Cup (LM4x)
2008 Bronze Rowing World Championship (LM8+) Pieter Rom Colthoff
2009 Bronze Rowing World Cup (M2-) David Kuiper & Mitchel Steenman
2012 Gold Rowing European Championship (M2-) Mitchel Steenman
2013 Gold Rowing World Championship (LW4x) Maaike Head, Rianne Sigmond
2013 Bronze World Rowing Championship (M2-) Mitchel Steenman
2014 Gold Rowing World Championship (LW4x) Maaike Head
2014 Bronze Rowing European Championship (M2-) Mitchel Steenman
2015 Bronze Rowing World Cup I (LW2x) Maaike Head
2015 Gold Rowing World Cup II (M2-) Mitchel Steenman
2016 Silver Rowing World Cup I (M2-) Mitchel Steenman
2016 Gold and Bronze Rowing European Championship (LW2x) Maaike Head, (M2-) Mitchel Steenman
2016 Gold Rowing World Championship (LW2x) Maaike Head
2016 Silver Rowing World Cup II (M2-) Mitchel Steenman
2016 Gold Rowing World Cup III (LW2x) Maaike Head
2016 Gold at Olympic Games (LW2x) Maaike Head
2017 Silver and Bronze at Rowing European Championship (LW2x) Marieke Keijser, (W4-) Lisanne Brandsma

See also 
 G.S.R. Aegir

References 

 Isis and St. Edward's carry local colours into semi-finals, Oxford Sports Network, July 5, 2003

External links 
 Skadi Homepage

Sports clubs in Rotterdam
Rowing clubs in the Netherlands
Sports clubs established in 1928
1928 establishments in the Netherlands